Yarebitsa Cove (‘Zaliv Yarebitsa’ \'za-liv ya-'re-bi-tsa\) is the 900 m wide cove on Osmar Strait. It is indenting for 570 m off the southeast coast of Smith Island in the South Shetland Islands, Antarctica, and enters northeast of Skalina Point and southwest of Ivan Asen Point.  Its head is fed by Armira Glacier.

The cove is named after the settlements of Yarebitsa in Northeastern and Southern Bulgaria.

Location
Bulgarian mapping in 2009 and 2017.

Maps
Chart of South Shetland including Coronation Island, &c. from the exploration of the sloop Dove in the years 1821 and 1822 by George Powell Commander of the same. Scale ca. 1:200000. London: Laurie, 1822.
  L.L. Ivanov. Antarctica: Livingston Island and Greenwich, Robert, Snow and Smith Islands. Scale 1:120000 topographic map. Troyan: Manfred Wörner Foundation, 2010.  (First edition 2009. )
 South Shetland Islands: Smith and Low Islands. Scale 1:150000 topographic map No. 13677. British Antarctic Survey, 2009.
 Antarctic Digital Database (ADD). Scale 1:250000 topographic map of Antarctica. Scientific Committee on Antarctic Research (SCAR). Since 1993, regularly upgraded and updated.
 L.L. Ivanov. Antarctica: Livingston Island and Smith Island. Scale 1:100000 topographic map. Manfred Wörner Foundation, 2017.

References
 Bulgarian Antarctic Gazetteer. Antarctic Place-names Commission. (details in Bulgarian, basic data in English)
Yarebitsa Cove. SCAR Composite Antarctic Gazetteer.

External links
 Yarebitsa Cove. Copernix satellite image

Bulgaria and the Antarctic
Coves of Smith Island (South Shetland Islands)